Linda Ann Ward (born May 24, 1947 in Puslinch, Ontario) is a Canadian former pair skater. With partner Neil Carpenter, she won a bronze medal at the Canadian Figure Skating Championships in 1963, captured a silver the following year, and competed at the 1964 Winter Olympics.

Results
pairs with Carpenter

References

1947 births
Canadian female pair skaters
Figure skaters at the 1964 Winter Olympics
Olympic figure skaters of Canada
Living people